General elections were held in the Bahamas between 8 and 20 June 1956. Although the Progressive Liberal Party emerged as the largest party, winning six seats, the majority of seats were won by independents.

Results

Elected MPs

References

Elections in the Bahamas
Bahamas
1956 in the Bahamas
Bahamas
Election and referendum articles with incomplete results